W Abu Dhabi - Yas Island, formerly the Yas Hotel and Yas Viceroy Hotel Abu Dhabi, is a five-star hotel famous for being built above and across the F1 Yas Marina Circuit on Yas Island in Abu Dhabi, the capital of the United Arab Emirates. It is known as one of the icons of Abu Dhabi and has a futuristic design.

Design
The hotel is located within the Yas Marina Circuit, Abu Dhabi. The building, designed by Hani Rashid and Lise Anne Couture, principals of New York based Asymptote Architecture, consists of two 12 storey hotel towers, one set within the race circuit and another placed in the Marina itself, linked together by a monocoque steel and glass bridge and Grid Shell structure that both cross above and over the Yas Marina Circuit F1 race track.

Asymptote designed the building as an architectural landmark that embodies key influences and local as well as global inspirations that range from the aesthetics and forms associated with speed and spectacle to the artistry and geometries that form the basis of ancient Islamic art and craft traditions.

Of architectural and engineering significance is the main feature of the hotelʼs design: a 217-meter expanse of sweeping, curvilinear glass and steel facade known as the Grid Shell: it features an LED lighting system that illuminates all 5,389 glass elements individually, with an integrated control system that updates color and brightness of each glass pane 20 times per second. The Grid Shell is a key feature of the overall architectural design and significance of the project. It creates an atmospheric-like veil that is visible from miles away.

The hotel was designed by Asymptote to become a significant and important landmark for Abu Dhabi. For the dynamic facade lighting design, the architects collaborated with Rogier van der Heide and his team at Arup Lighting. The lighting design was recognized with an AL Lighting Design Award for Outstanding Achievement and a "Highly Commended" Middle East Lighting Design Award, as well as a special "Citation for Achievement in Technical Artistry at the 2010 IES Lumen Awards Ceremony in New York City.

"The hotel embodies various key influences and inspirations ranging from the aesthetics and forms associated with speed, movement and spectacle to the artistry and geometries forming the basis of ancient Islamic art and craft traditions, a perfect union and harmonious interplay between elegance and spectacle. The search here was inspired by what one could call the 'art' and poetics of motor racing, specifically Formula 1, coupled with the making of a place that celebrates Abu Dhabi as a cultural and technological tour de force.”

Construction
The 499-room, 85,000-square-meter structure was built by Al Futtaim Carillion for Aldar Properties with construction starting in 2007. 

The feature façade, formed of a steel and glass reptile-like gridshell, was designed and built by Austrian specialist contractor Waagner Biro.

It opened on 1 November 2009 to coincide with the Formula 1 Etihad Airways Abu Dhabi Grand Prix.

See also 
 Ferrari World
 Al Reem Island
 Saadiyat Island

References

External links

 Official homepage
 Official site of the island

Hotel buildings completed in 2009
Hotels in Abu Dhabi
Hotels established in 2009
2009 establishments in the United Arab Emirates